K-92 is an approximately  state highway in the U.S. state of Kansas.  western terminus is at  south of the community of Rock Creek, and the eastern terminus is a continuation as Missouri State Route 92 at the Missouri border by the City of Leavenworth.  is co-designated as U.S. Route 59  in Oskaloosa,  from Oskaloosa to McLouth, and  and  in Leavenworth.

In the 1850s, a military road was built connecting Fort Riley with Fort Leavenworth, which  follows or closely follows. Before state highways were numbered in Kansas there were auto trails.  western terminus  was part of the former Southwest Trail. The section of the highway that overlaps  and  closely follows or was part of the George Washington National Highway and former King of Trails. In the mid 1950s,  was realigned in Leavenworth to cross the new bridge over the Missouri River. In the mid 1960s, the highway was rerouted slightly to make room for Perry Lake, which was being constructed by the US Army Corps of Engineers.

Route description
The National Highway System is a system of highways important to the nation's defense, economy, and mobility.  also connects to the National Highway System at its western terminus, K-4. All but  of  alignment is maintained by KDOT.

Jefferson County
After about  it passes through the south end of Ozawkie. As the highway exits the city it begins to cross the causeway across Perry Lake. At the other side, the highway curves northeast and crosses Fishpond Creek roughly  later.  curves back east, crosses Little Slough Creek, then shifts south slightly. The highway advances east for roughly  through rolling hills, then curves southeast and crosses Slough Creek. The road continues about  then curves east and enters Oskaloosa as Jefferson Street.

After roughly  the highway curves back east.  and  continue east through flat rural farmlands for about  then enters McLouth as Lake Street. After about   turns north onto South Union Street, as  continues east along Lake Street.  then exits the city  later. The highway advances north through mostly flat farmlands for roughly  then crosses Prairie Creek. The road then curves east and crosses Prairie Creek again.  passes through rolling hills with farmlands for  then enters Leavenworth County.

Leavenworth County
 advances through rural farmlands for about  then passes through Springdale and curves northeast. After a short distance the road curves more east, just east of Yllier Lake. The road meanders northeastward through a mix of forested and open lands for about  then curves east. The highway continues for about  then crosses Rock Creek.  continues east for about  then shifts south slightly.

The roadway advances eastward through rural farmlands for roughly  then curves northeast. The highway soon crosses Three Mile Creek then reaches Metropolitan Avenue. Here,  and  curve turn west and  turns east.  continues east for a short distance then begins to cross the Centennial Bridge, which crosses a Union Pacific Railroad track and the Missouri River. About halfway across it enters into Missouri, where it continues as Missouri Route 92.

History

Early roads
In a March 3, 1853, act of Congress, $11,125 (equivalent to $ in ) was appropriated to build bridges and establish communications between Fort Leavenworth and Fort Riley. By 1857, $9,181 (equivalent to $ in ) has been expended and to finish building bridges and excavation, a further $50,000 (equivalent to $ in ) was requested. In 1863, the Kansas territorial legislature passed a resolution for Congress to make provisions for improving the road from Fort Leavenworth via Fort Riley to Fort Larned. At that time, the road lacked bridges in places and at some times of the year was impassable, which caused delay to the US Military. Certain sections of K-92 closely follow the former military road, especially near Ozawkie and Oskaloosa.

Around 1910, a national system of auto trails was created in the United States as well as in Canada. K-92's western terminus (K-4) was part of the former Southwest Trail, which ran from El Paso to Chicago. The section of the highway that overlaps K-7 and US-73 closely follows or was part of the George Washington National Highway, which ran from Seattle east to Savannah, and former King of Trails, which ran from Galveston north to Winnipeg, Manitoba. The section of K-92 that overlaps with US-59 was part of the former Southwest Trail and former Corn Belt Route, which began south of Marysville and traveled east to Bonner Springs.

Establishment and realignments
 was first designated as a state highway in 1926. It then overlapped  (modern ) for a short distance then continued east to the Missouri border. By 1927,  became  and  became . In a January 28, 1941 resolution,  was realigned by Ozawkie to eliminate two turns and to fix some sharp curves. ,  and  originally followed Cherokee Street in Rock Creek. By 1966 the U.S. Army Corps of Engineers had begun building Perry Lake.

The former crossing of the Missouri River was located slightly north of the current bridge. It was opened in 1872, and known as the Fort Bridge. In a March 24, 1954 resolution, it was approved to realign  in Leavenworth to cross the new bridge being built over the Missouri River. The Centennial Bridge opened with a ribbon-cutting ceremony on April 2, 1955. Five thousand were in attendance to see Representative William R. Hull of Missouri and Senator Frank Carlson of Kansas cut the ribbon. The bridge cost $3.5 million (equivalent to $ in ) to build and opened as a toll road to repay bonds used to finance the construction. Tolls were initially set at $0.15 for passenger cars and $0.15 per axle for trucks (equivalent to $ in ). A plaque on one of the piers read "A memorial dedicated to those who gave their lives to their country, 1854–1954." Six and a half miles of new road and bridge was needed to connect to Metropolitan Avenue in Leavenworth on the Kansas side and the existing section of Missouri Route 92 on the Missouri side.

Major intersections

References

External links

Kansas Department of Transportation State Map
KDOT: Historic State Maps

092
Transportation in Jefferson County, Kansas
Transportation in Leavenworth County, Kansas